Bygides groenlandicus is a marine scale worm that lives in cold waters.

Description
It has 39 segments and is 70 millimeters (about 2.76 inches) in length. It possesses very long, filamentous chaetae. It scales are brown on its dorsal, medial, and posterior sides, and its ventral side is grey or colorless. Two bands of lighter color run across its dorsal side.

Distribution
It is found in the Arctic and North Atlantic waters, as well as off the coast of Massachusetts, the Gulf of Maine, and Newfoundland.

References

External links
 World Register of Marine Species page

Phyllodocida